Nam Zad (also Romanized as Nam Zād; also known as Nowzād and Nūrzād) is a village in Bezenjan Rural District, in the Central District of Baft County, Kerman Province, Iran. At the 2006 census, its population was 282, in 61 families.

References 

Populated places in Baft County